Danial Scott Crichton (born 11 April 2003) is a Singaporean footballer currently playing as a defender for Young Lions.

Career statistics

Club

Notes

International statistics

U19 International caps

References

2003 births
Living people
Singaporean footballers
Canadian soccer players
Association football defenders
Singapore Premier League players
Warriors FC players
Young Lions FC players